National Coming Out Day (NCOD) is an annual LGBT awareness day observed on October 11, to support anyone "coming out of the closet". First celebrated in the United States in 1988, the initial idea was grounded in the feminist and gay liberation spirit of the personal being political, and the emphasis on the most basic form of activism being coming out to family, friends and colleagues, and living life as an openly lesbian or gay person. The founders belief was that homophobia thrives in an atmosphere of silence and ignorance and that once people know that they have loved ones who are lesbian or gay, they are far less likely to maintain homophobic or oppressive views.

History
NCOD was inaugurated in 1988 by Robert Eichberg and Jean O'Leary. Eichberg, who died in 1995 of complications from AIDS, was a psychologist from New Mexico and the founder of the personal growth workshop "The Experience". O'Leary was an openly lesbian political leader and long-time activist from New York and was at the time the head of the National Gay Rights Advocates in Los Angeles. LGBT activists, including Eichberg and O'Leary, did not want to respond defensively to anti-LGBT action because they believed it would be predictable. This led them to establish NCOD to maintain positivity and celebrate coming out. The date of October 11 was chosen because it is the anniversary of the 1987 National March on Washington for Lesbian and Gay Rights.

Most people think they don't know anyone gay or lesbian, and in fact, everybody does. It is imperative that we come out and let people know who we are and disabuse them of their fears and stereotypes.
– Robert Eichberg, in 1993

Initially administered from the West Hollywood offices of the National Gay Rights Advocates, the first NCOD received participation from eighteen states, garnering national media coverage. In its second year, NCOD headquarters moved to Santa Fe, New Mexico, and participation grew to 21 states. After a media push in 1990, NCOD was observed in all 50 states and seven other countries. Participation continued to grow and in 1990 NCOD merged their efforts with the Human Rights Campaign.

Observance
National Coming Out Day is observed annually to celebrate coming out and to raise awareness of the LGBT community and civil rights movement. The first decades of observances were marked by private and public people coming out, often in the media, to raise awareness and let the mainstream know that everyone knows at least one person who is lesbian or gay. In recent years, the day has been more of a holiday because coming out as LGBT is far less risky in most Western countries. Participants often wear pride symbols such as pink triangles and rainbow flags.

National Coming Out Day is also observed in Ireland, Switzerland, the Netherlands and the United Kingdom. In the United States, the Human Rights Campaign sponsors NCOD events under the auspices of their National Coming Out Project, offering resources to LGBT individuals, couples, parents, and children, as well as straight friends and relatives, to promote awareness of LGBT families living honest and open lives. Candace Gingrich became the spokesperson for NCOD in April 1995. From 1999 to 2014, the Human Rights Campaign announced a theme to go with each NCOD:

 1999: Come Out to Congress
 2000: Think it O-o-ver (Who Will Pick the New Supremes?)
 2001: An Out Odyssey 
 2002: Being Out Rocks!
 2003: It's a Family Affair
 2004: Come Out. Speak Out. Vote. 
 2005–2007: Talk About It
 2009: Conversations from the Heart
 2010–2011: Coming Out for Equality
 2012: Come Out. Vote.
 2013–2014: Coming Out Still Matters

Perspectives on "coming out" 
Radical feminist poet and author Adrienne Rich, in her 1980 essay "Compulsory Heterosexuality and Lesbian Existence", suggests that the need to come out stems from the pressure to adhere to heterosexuality from birth, or compulsory heterosexuality. Rich uses the example that heterosexual people never have to come out as heterosexual, and that societal support of heterosexuality as the norm leads to homosexuality being viewed as an anomaly. She explores how the oppressive, ubiquitous nature of compulsory heterosexuality has historically resulted in many lesbians either never realizing their true nature or not discovering their orientation until later in life.

NCOD has traditionally been a celebratory day for the LGBT community. However, Preston Mitchum, a black queer writer, in his article, "On National Coming Out Day, Don't Disparage the Closet", published in The Atlantic in 2013, questions the assumptions that he believes NCOD makes. While Mitchum does not discredit those who have come out and praises them for their bravery, he also points out that coming out may not always be safe for LGBT people who are a part of multiple marginalized communities. Mitchum also suggests that coming out can lead to hypervisibility for those with intersecting identities, potentially leading to discrimination in the workplace, family exile, violence, and criminalization.

See also

 Ally Week, observed in October
 Day of Silence, observed in April
 Harvey Milk Day
 International Day Against Homophobia, Transphobia and Biphobia, observed on May 17
 LGBT History Month
 LGBT rights in the United States
 Mattachine Society
 National Equality March, October 11, 2009
 World AIDS Day, December 1

References

External links

 National Coming Out Day (US)
 National Coming Out Day (Switzerland)
 RUComingOut – Real Life Coming Out stories

1988 establishments in the United States
Civil awareness days
History of LGBT civil rights in the United States
LGBT events in the United States
October observances
LGBT-related observances